Papaver radicatum is a species of poppy known by the common names Arctic poppy, rooted poppy, and yellow poppy. It is a flowering plant in the family Papaveraceae.

Distribution
Papaver radicatum is circumpolar in distribution and grows in arctic and alpine zones in Europe, North America, and Asia.

Papaver radicatum grows at a latitude of 83°40'N on Kaffeklubben Island, making it one of the northernmost plants in the world. It appears on the Coat of arms of Nunavut. 

The plant is known for appearing in white and yellow colorations. The yellow variant is much more widely distributed, occurring out in the open, compared to the white flowers typically only found in more remote locations.

Characteristics 
Papaver radicatum has hair like structures covering the stem and sepals that are used to retain heat to act as insulation. The plant also shows heliotropism where the flower grows to face the sunlight, and the petals reflect light towards the pistil. The petals grow in a cup shape that are used to trap light and air inside to be used as warmth for the ovaries.

Pollination
Bombus polaris is a known pollinator of this species. Its pollinator impact is heaviest in early spring, decreasing as the year continues. As the year ends, the fly population is known to be the major pollinator at that time.

Taxonomy
The Flora of North America lists four subspecies:
Papaver radicatum subsp. alaskanum (Hultén) J. P. Anderson
Papaver radicatum subsp. kluanensis (D. Löve) D. F. Murray
Papaver radicatum subsp. polare Tolmatchew
Papaver radicatum subsp. radicatum

See also
Svalbard poppy, another poppy of the extreme north.

References

External links

radicatum
Flora of the Arctic